Digital Life is a research and educational program about radically rethinking of the human-computer interactive experience. It integrates digital world (information & services) and physical world (physical objects/environment). It makes interfaces more responsive and proactive (objects & environments monitor user and (proactively) present information & services relevant to user’s current needs/interests)

The program is to use information technology to augment physical environments and objects around the people that can draw attention. When one is walking around town, for example, the system points out buildings/places of particular interest to a user. The program is also to augment reality in order to provide a composite view for the participants: a mix of a real scene with the virtual scene that augments the digital environment with interactive information.

The Program was originally initiated by MIT Media Lab as: Digital Life is a multi-sponsor, Lab-wide research consortium that conducts basic research on technologies and techniques that spur expression as well as social and economic activity. They first explore the design and scalability of agile, grassroots communications systems that incorporate a growing understanding of emergent social behaviors in a digital world; the second considers a cognitive architecture that can support many features of “human intelligent thinking” and its expressive and economic use; and the third extends the idea of inclusive design to immersive, affective, and biological interfaces and actions.

External links
 http://dl.media.mit.edu

Multimedia
Emergence